The Order of Naval Merit is an honour awarded to members of the Dominican Navy. It was established on 5 July 1954.

Divisions
The award is divided in four decorations, in order of precedence:

 Valour Medal: to Non-Commissioned Officers.
 Honour Medal: to Junior Officers and Midshipmen.
 Distinguished Medal: to Junior Officers and Midshipmen.
 Naval Merit Medal: to General Officers and Superior Officers.

Post-Nominal
The person awarded with this honour should be added the post-nominal M. N. (Mérito Naval, Spanish for Naval Merit) after his or her full name, in all the official papers and documents.

See also
 Orders, decorations, and medals of the Dominican Republic

References

External links
Medallas Marina Guerra. República Dominicana.

Naval Merit, Order of
Naval Merit, Order of